Still Small Voices is a 2007 film starring Catherine Bell as a female 911 dispatcher, Michael Summer, who receives ghostly phone calls from a little girl. Michael is compelled to investigate this girl's mysterious disappearance, which she believes is somehow linked to  recent nightmares. Co-starring in the film are Mark Humphrey as Ash Summer and Damir Andrei as Bud Atherton.  The film premiered on Lifetime Movie Network on January 6, 2007.  The screenplay was written by Jolene Rice and it was directed by Mario Azzopardi.

External links

2007 television films
2007 films
Lifetime (TV network) films
Films directed by Mario Philip Azzopardi